Elena Sánchez Caballero (born 25 December 1957)  is a Spanish journalist. Since August 2018, she has been RTVE's corporate secretary general, a member of the team led by Rosa María Mateo. From 2008 to 2014 she was RTVE's viewer ombudsman.

Biography
After receiving a licentiate in journalism at the Complutense University of Madrid, Elena Sánchez Caballero started her professional career at the EFE news agency in 1982. Two years later, she joined Televisión Española (TVE), where she initially focused on sports journalism. From 1986 to 1987 she presented , Spanish television's first morning news program.

On New Year's Eve 1991, Sánchez was part of the trio of  presenters with Constantino Romero and Joaquín Prat.

In 1996 she was assigned to present news on the channel 24 Horas. In 2004 she returned to Telediario, taking charge of its third edition, while also working on the program Crónicas. In 2006 she left Telediario to replace Pedro Piqueras in presenting and directing the debate program , on air until 2007.

In March 2008, Sánchez was named RTVE's ombudsman for the viewer, the listener, and the user of interactive media, a new position created to respond to the complaints and questions of the audience. She also assumed direction and presentation of the show RTVE responde. She was replaced by Carmen Sastre in April 2014. In April 2015 she began directing and presenting the gastronomic show Al punto. In 2018 she submitted her candidacy for the public tender to head the RTVE Corporation.

On 1 August 2018, she was appointed corporate general secretary of RTVE on the team led by provisional administrator Rosa María Mateo.

On 25 February 2021, she was appointed by the Cortes Generales as member of the Board of Directors of RTVE.

On 27 September 2022, the Board appointed her as acting chair.

References

External links
 

1957 births
Complutense University of Madrid alumni
Living people
People from Madrid
Spanish television directors
Spanish television journalists
Spanish television presenters
Spanish women television presenters
Spanish women journalists
Women television directors
RTVE Board members